Marcello Vincenzo Domenico Mastroianni  (28 September 1924 – 19 December 1996) was an Italian film actor, regarded as one of his country's most iconic male performers of the 20th century. He played leading roles for many of Italy's top directors in a career spanning 147 films between 1939 and 1997, and garnered many international honors including 2 BAFTA Awards, 2 Best Actor awards at the Venice and Cannes film festivals, 2 Golden Globes, and 3 Academy Award nominations.

Born in the province of Frosinone and raised in Turin and Rome, Mastroianni made his film debut in 1939 at the age of 14, but did not seriously pursue acting until the 1950s, when he made his critical and commercial breakthrough in the caper comedy Big Deal on Madonna Street (1959). He became an international celebrity through his collaborations with director Federico Fellini, first as a disillusioned tabloid columnist in La Dolce Vita (1960), then as a creatively-stifled filmmaker in 8½ (1963). Excelling in both dramatic and comedic roles, he formed a notable on-screen duo with actress and sex symbol Sophia Loren, co-starring with her in eight films between 1954 and 1994.

Despite international acclaim, Mastroianni largely shunned Hollywood, and remained a quintessentially Italian thespian for the majority of his career. Nonetheless, he was the first actor to receive an Academy Award nomination for a non-English language performance, and was nominated for Best Actor three times – Divorce Italian Style (1961), A Special Day (1977), and Dark Eyes (1987). He was one of only three actors, the others being Jack Lemmon and Dean Stockwell, to win the prestigious Cannes Film Festival Award for Best Actor twice. Mastroianni's contributions to Italian art and culture saw him receive multiple civil honours, including the Order of Merit of the Italian Republic, the highest ranking knighthood of the country.

Early life
Mastroianni was born in Fontana Liri, a small village in the Apennines within the Lazio province of Frosinone, and grew up in Turin and Rome. He was the son of Ida (née Irolle) and Ottone Mastroianni. Both of his parents were from the nearby town of Arpino. His father ran a carpentry shop. Mastroianni was a nephew of sculptor Umberto Mastroianni. During World War II, after the division into Axis and Allied Italy, he was interned in a loosely guarded German prison camp, from which he escaped to hide in Venice.

His brother Ruggero Mastroianni was a film editor who worked on some of Marcello's films (City of Women, Ginger and Fred), and appeared alongside Marcello in Scipione detto anche l'Africano, a spoof of the once popular Sword and Sandal film genre released in 1971.

Acting career

Mastroianni made his screen debut as an uncredited extra in Marionette (1939) when he was fourteen, and made intermittent minor film appearances until landing his first big role in Atto d'accusa (1951). Within a decade he became a major international celebrity, starring in Big Deal on Madonna Street (1958); and in Federico Fellini's La Dolce Vita (1960) playing a disillusioned and self-loathing tabloid columnist who spends his days and nights exploring Rome's decadent high society. Mastroianni followed La Dolce Vita with another signature role, that of a film director who, amidst self-doubt and troubled love affairs, finds himself in a creative block while making a film in Fellini's 8½ (1963).

His other prominent films include Days of Love (1954) with Marina Vlady; La Notte (1961) with Jeanne Moreau; Too Bad She's Bad (1954), Lucky to Be a Woman (1956), Yesterday, Today and Tomorrow (1963), Marriage Italian Style (1964), Sunflower (1970), The Priest's Wife (1971), A Special Day (1977) and Robert Altman's Prêt-à-Porter (1994) – all co-starring Sophia Loren; Luchino Visconti's White Nights (1957); Pietro Germi's Divorce Italian Style (1961); Family Diary (1962) with Jacques Perrin; A Very Private Affair (1962) with Brigitte Bardot; Mario Monicelli's Casanova 70 (1965); Diamonds for Breakfast (1968) with Rita Tushingham; The Pizza Triangle (1970) with Monica Vitti; Massacre in Rome (1973) with Richard Burton; The Sunday Woman (1975) with Jacqueline Bisset; Stay As You Are (1978) with Nastassja Kinski; Fellini's City of Women (1980) and Ginger and Fred (1986); Marco Bellocchio's Henry IV (1984); Macaroni (1985) with Jack Lemmon; Nikita Mikhalkov's Dark Eyes (1987) with Marthe Keller; Giuseppe Tornatore's Everybody's Fine (1990); Used People (1992) with Shirley MacLaine; and Agnès Varda's One Hundred and One Nights (1995).

He was nominated for the Academy Award for Best Actor three times: for Divorce Italian Style, A Special Day and Dark Eyes. Mastroianni, Dean Stockwell and Jack Lemmon are the only actors to have been twice awarded the Best Actor at the Cannes Film Festival. Mastroianni won it in 1970 for The Pizza Triangle and in 1987 for Dark Eyes.

Mastroianni starred alongside his daughter, Chiara Mastroianni, in Raúl Ruiz's Three Lives and Only One Death in 1996. For this performance he won the Silver Wave Award at the Ft. Lauderdale International Film Festival. His final film, Voyage to the Beginning of the World (1997), was released posthumously.

Personal life
Mastroianni married Flora Carabella on 12 August 1950. They had one daughter together, Barbara (1951–2018), and informally separated in 1964 because of his affairs with younger women. Mastroianni's first serious relationship after the separation was with Faye Dunaway, his co-star in A Place for Lovers (1968). Dunaway wanted to marry and have children, but Mastroianni, a Catholic, refused to divorce Carabella. In 1970, after more than two years of waiting for Mastroianni to change his mind, Dunaway left him. Mastroianni told a reporter for People magazine in 1987 that he never got over the breakup. "She was the woman I loved the most," he said. "I'll always be sorry to have lost her. I was whole with her for the first time in my life." In her 1995 autobiography Looking for Gatsby, Dunaway wrote: "I wish to this day it had worked out."

Mastroianni had a daughter, Chiara Mastroianni (born 28 May 1972), with French actress Catherine Deneuve, who was nearly 20 years his junior and lived with him for four years in the 1970s. During that time, the couple made four films together: It Only Happens to Others (1971), La cagna (1972), A Slightly Pregnant Man (1973) and Don't Touch the White Woman! (1974). After Mastroianni and Deneuve broke up, Carabella reportedly offered to adopt Chiara because her parents' busy careers kept them away so often. Deneuve would have none of it.

Mastroianni's other lovers reportedly included actresses Anouk Aimée, Carole Mallory, Claudia Cardinale, Lauren Hutton and Ursula Andress. By 1976, he became involved with Anna Maria Tatò, an author and filmmaker. They remained together until his death.

He was made a Knight Grand Cross of the Order of Merit of the Italian Republic in 1994.

Death

Mastroianni died of pancreatic cancer on 19 December 1996 at the age of 72. Both of his daughters, as well as Deneuve and Tatò, were at his bedside. The Trevi Fountain in Rome, associated with his role in Fellini's La Dolce Vita, was symbolically turned off and draped in black as a tribute.

At the 1997 Venice Film Festival, Chiara, Carabella and Deneuve tried to block the screening of Tatò's four-hour documentary, Marcello Mastroianni: I Remember. The festival refused and the film was shown. The three women reportedly tried to do the same thing at Cannes. Tatò said Mastroianni had willed her all rights to his image.

Filmography

Film

Television

Awards and nominations

Wins
David di Donatello
Best Actor
1964 Yesterday, Today and Tomorrow
1965 Marriage Italian Style
1986 Ginger and Fred
1988 Dark Eyes
1995 Sostiene Pereira
1983 Carrer David
1995 Special David
1997 Carrer David (posthumous)
Nastro d'Argento
Best Actor
1955 Days of Love
1958 White Nights
1961 La Dolce Vita
1962 Divorce Italian Style
1986 Ginger and Fred
1988 Dark Eyes
1991 Towards Evening
1997 Special Nastro d'Argento (posthumous)
Venice Film Festival
Golden Lion
1990 Honorary Award
Best Actor
1989 What Time Is It?
Best Supporting Actor
1993 1, 2, 3, Sun
Cannes Film Festival
Best Actor
1970 The Pizza Triangle
 1988 Dark Eyes
BAFTA Award
Best Foreign Actor
1963 Divorce Italian Style
1964 Yesterday, Today and Tomorrow
Golden Globe Award
Golden Globe Award for Best Actor – Motion Picture Musical or Comedy
1962 Divorce Italian Style
César Award
1993 Honorary César

Nominations
Academy Award
Academy Award for Best Actor
1962 Divorce Italian Style
1977 A Special Day
1987 Dark Eyes

See also
List of actors with Academy Award nominations
List of actors with two or more Academy Award nominations in acting categories
List of Italian Academy Award winners and nominees

Notes

References

Works cited

External links

 
 
 
 Encyclopædia Britannica, Marcello Mastroianni
 Chris Fujiwara, "Dream lover: Marcello Mastroianni at the MFA"
 Geographical coordinates and pictures of his grave
 Marcello Mastroianni at Filmreference.com

1924 births
1996 deaths
20th-century Italian male actors
People of Lazian descent
European Film Awards winners (people)
Best Foreign Actor BAFTA Award winners
Best Musical or Comedy Actor Golden Globe (film) winners
César Honorary Award recipients
Cannes Film Festival Award for Best Actor winners
Deaths from cancer in France
Deaths from pancreatic cancer
Italian Roman Catholics
Italian male film actors
People from the Province of Frosinone
David di Donatello winners
Nastro d'Argento winners
Ciak d'oro winners
Volpi Cup for Best Actor winners
World War II civilian prisoners
Italian prisoners of war in World War II
World War II prisoners of war held by Germany
Italian escapees
Escapees from German detention